Kapileshwar Temple (Nepali :कपिलेश्वरनाथ महादेव मन्दिर) is a temple of Lord Shiva situated at Janakpur, Nepal. According to the legend, in Treta Yuga, King Janak had constructed Shiva temples at the four corners of his capital Janakpur. Kaplileshowar is one of the temples. It is believed that the temple was used by Kapil, a Hindu sage, as an Aashram as well, hence the name.

The temple occupies a land of five Kattha. There are a temples of goddess Santoshi in the North, Ganesh in East, Ram-Janaki in South and Hanuman in the west.

In the earthquake of 1990 BS, the temple was destroyed and the main idols of the temple were stolen. The idols have not been found yet. Initially, the temple was constructed in Simrangad architecture. After the damage in 1990 BS earthquake, Bishunu Giri, a kawariya constructed the temple without any government fund. In 2039 BS, a fund was allocated by government to reconstruct the temple and to reinstate the Shiva linga.

See also
List of Hindu temples in Nepal

References

Hindu temples in Janakpur